Randy Wood may refer to:

Randy Wood (artist) (born 1970), American artist
Randy Wood (ice hockey) (born 1963), American ice hockey player
Randy Wood (record producer) (1917–2011), American recording executive; founder of Dot Records
Randy Wood (music executive) (1929–1980), American head of Vee-Jay Records and founder of Mira Records
Randy Wood (politician) (born 1947), member of the Alabama House of Representatives
Randy Wood, cofounder of Northern Cree Singers

See also
Randy Woods (born 1970), American basketball player